Sosale is a small village near T.Narsipur in Mysore district of Karnataka province in India.

Location
Sosale is located on the left bank of the Cauvery River near its confluence with the Kabini River, about 3 km away from the Agastheswara Temple at Tirumakudlu.

Administration
Sosale is under the jurisdiction of T.Narsipur Taluk in Mysore district, Karnataka State, India.

Sosale Devasthana
Sosale Devasthana is a beautiful temple in the village. shri Honnadevi temple and hoobaleshwari temple.

The temple is breathtakingly beautiful and is located in the middle of vast expanses of paddy fields.  It is an ideal picnic spot.  There are white domes on the back of the temple which is a kind ancient worship ritual of the locals.

References

Image gallery

Villages in Mysore district